Sin Don (신돈, 辛旽; 21 January 1322 – 21 August 1371) was a Korean Buddhist monk and scholar during the Goryeo Dynasty; His Dharma name was Pyeonjo and became a teacher and advisor of Gongmin of Goryeo.

Summary
He was a Buddhist monk. He had the full confidence of King Gongmin, and he tried to reform the society of Goryeo. King Gongmin judged Shin Don clever. In 1365, King Gongmin gave him the nickname "Cheonghan Geosa" and the noble title Jinpyeonghu (Chinpyŏng Marquess)

He appointed a shinjin sadaebu (hangul: 신진사대부) (a group of new high-level officials) with an air of freshness and drove out some people who had acquired power. Also, he promoted setting up the Jeonmin Byeonjeong Dogam (hangul: 전민변정도감, hanja: 田民辨整都監), a kind of government office to reform the land and nation in 1366. Thus, he was met with opposition by some powerful families. While surrounded by flatterers, he didn't have any supporters. Finally King Gongmin executed him in 1371.

Criticism 
King Gongmin's attempt to regain the leadership of the state through the introduction of the Sin Don has achieved some success. However, for this purpose, King Kongun had almost entrusted Sin Don with full authority, and had to face criticism by making a lame political operation allowing Sin Don to do an equal example with the king.

In popular culture
Portrayed by Son Chang-min in the 2005-2006 MBC TV series Sin Don.
Portrayed by Yoo Ha-joon in the 2012-2013 SBS TV series The Great Seer.

See also
 Yi Jaehyeon
 Gongmin of Goryeo
 U of Goryeo

References

 Shin Don 
 Shin Don 

1322 births
1371 deaths
Goryeo Buddhist monks
Assassinated Korean people
People murdered in Korea
Korean revolutionaries
People from South Gyeongsang Province
Goryeo writers
Yeongsan Shin clan